Luis Santos may refer to:
 Luis Martín-Santos (1924–1964), Spanish psychiatrist and author
 Luís Capoulas Santos (born 1951), Portuguese politician
 Luís Santos (chess player) (born 1955), Portuguese chess player
 Luis Mariano Santos (born 1969), Spanish politician
 Luís Santos (fighter) (born 1980), Brazilian mixed martial artist
 Luís Santos (water polo) (born 1980), Brazilian water polo player
 Luis Miguel Santos born (1969), Portuguese Olympic Soling sailor
 Luis Santos (baseball) (born 1991), Dominican baseball player
 Luís Santos (footballer) (born 2000), Portuguese footballer
 Luis Santos Silva, Paraguayan footballer